France competed at the 1976 Summer Olympics in Montreal, Quebec, Canada. 206 competitors, 177 men and 29 women, took part in 128 events in 18 sports.

Medalists

Gold
 Guy Drut — Athletics, Men's 110m Hurdles
 Hubert Parot, Michel Roche, Marc Roguet and Marcel Rozier — Equestrian, Jumping Team Competition

Silver
 Daniel Morelon — Cycling, Men's 1000m Sprint (Scratch)
 Brigitte Dumont, Brigitte Gaudin-Latrille, Claudie Josland, Christine Muzio, and Véronique Trinquet — Fencing, Women's Foil Team Competition
 Daniel Senet — Weightlifting, Men's Lightweight

Bronze
 Bernard Talvard — Fencing, Men's Foil Individual Competition
 Daniel Revenu, Frédéric Pietruszka, Christian Noël, Didier Flament, and Bernard Talvard — Fencing, Men's Foil Team Competition
 Henri Boerio — Gymnastics, Men's Horizontal Bar
 Patrick Vial — Judo, Men's Half Middleweight (70 kg)

Archery

In France's second appearance in modern Olympic archery, one woman and one man represented the nation.  Albert Le Tyrant posted France's best placing since 1920.

Women's Individual Competition:
 Marie-Christine Ventrillon – 2298 points (→ 17th place)

Men's Individual Competition:
 Albert Le Tyrant – 2408 points (→ 12th place)

Athletics

Men's 800 metres
 José Marajo
 Heat — 1:49.60 (→ did not advance)
 Marcel Philippe
 Heat — 1:50.81 (→ did not advance)
 Roqui Sanchez
 Heat — DSQ (→ did not advance)

Men's 5,000 metres
 Jacques Boxberger
 Heat — 13:36.94 (→ did not advance)
 Jean-Marie Conrath
 Heat — 13:34.39 (→ did not advance)

Men's 10,000 metres
 Jean-Paul Gomez
 Heat — 28:10.52
 Final — 28:24.07 (→ 9th place)
 Lucien Rault
 Heat — 29:40.76 (→ did not advance)
 Pierre Levisse
 Heat — 32:07.84 (→ did not advance)

Men's 400m Hurdles
 Jean-Pierre Perrinelle
 Heats — 50.78s
 Semi Final — 50.82s (→ did not advance)
 Jean-Claude Nallet
 Heats — 50.77s
 Semi Final — 50.82s (→ did not advance)

Men's Marathon
 Fernand Kolbeck
 Final — 2:22:56 (→ 34th place)

Men's 4x100 metres Relay
Jean-Claude Amoureux, Joseph Arame, Lucien Sainte-Rose, and  Dominique Chauvelot
 Heat — 39.71s 
 Semi Final — 39.33s 
 Final — 39.16s (→ 7th place)

Men's Long Jump
 Jacques Rousseau
 Qualification — 7.82m
 Final — 8.00m (→ 4th place)
 Philippe Deroche
 Qualification — 7.38m (→ did not advance)

Men's High Jump
 Paul Poaniewa
 Qualification — 2.05m (→ did not advance)
 Jacques Aletti
 Qualification — 2.05m (→ did not advance)

Men's Pole Vault
François Tracanelli
 Qualifying Round — 5.10m
 Final — no mark (→ no ranking)

Men's 20 km Race Walk
 Gérard Lelièvre — 1:29:53 (→ 9th place)

Women's 200 metres
 Chantal Réga
 Round 1 — 23.54
 Round 2 — 23.22
 Semifinals — 23.00
 Final — 23.09 (→ 8th place)

Boxing

Men's Light Flyweight (– 48 kg)
 José Leroy
 First Round — Lost to Said Mohamed Abdelwahab (EGY), KO-1

Canoeing

Cycling

Fourteen cyclists represented France in 1976.

Individual road race
 Jean-René Bernaudeau — 4:47:23.0 (→ 7th place) 
 Christian Jourdan — did not finish (→ no ranking) 
 Francis Duteil — did not finish (→ no ranking) 
 René Bittinger — did not finish (→ no ranking)

Team time trial
 Claude Buchon
 Loic Gautier
 Jean-Paul Maho
 Jean-Michel Richeux

Sprint
 Daniel Morelon —  Silver Medal

1000m time trial
 Eric Vermeulen — 1:07.846 (→ 5th place)

Individual pursuit
 Jean-Jacques Rebière — 12th place

Team pursuit
 Paul Bonno
 Jean-Marcel Brouzes
 Jean-Jacques Rebière
 Pierre Trentin

Diving

Equestrian

Fencing

18 fencers, 13 men and 5 women, represented France in 1976.

Men's foil
 Bernard Talvard
 Frédéric Pietruszka
 Christian Noël

Men's team foil
 Daniel Revenu, Christian Noël, Didier Flament, Bernard Talvard, Frédéric Pietruszka

Men's épée
 Philippe Boisse
 Philippe Riboud
 Jacques La Degaillerie

Men's team épée
 Philippe Boisse, François Jeanne, Philippe Riboud, Jacques La Degaillerie

Men's sabre
 Patrick Quivrin
 Régis Bonissent
 Philippe Bena

Men's team sabre
 Philippe Bena, Régis Bonissent, Bernard Dumont, Didier Flament, Patrick Quivrin

Women's foil
 Brigitte Gapais-Dumont
 Claudie Herbster-Josland
 Brigitte Latrille-Gaudin

Women's team foil
 Brigitte Latrille-Gaudin, Brigitte Gapais-Dumont, Christine Muzio, Véronique Trinquet, Claudie Herbster-Josland

Football

Gymnastics

Judo

Modern pentathlon

Three male pentathletes represented France in 1976.

Individual
 Alain Cortes
 Claude Guiguet
 Michel Gueguen

Team
 Alain Cortes
 Claude Guiguet
 Michel Gueguen

Rowing

Sailing

Shooting

Swimming

Weightlifting

Wrestling

References

Nations at the 1976 Summer Olympics
1976 Summer Olympics
Summer Olympics